This article lists dukes, electors, and kings ruling over different territories named Saxony from the beginning of the Saxon Duchy in the 6th century to the end of the German monarchies in 1918.

The electors of Saxony from John the Steadfast onwards were Lutheran until Augustus II of Saxony converted to Catholicism in order to be elected King of Poland and Grand Duke of Lithuania. His descendants (including all Kings of Saxony) have since been Catholic.

Old Saxony

The original Duchy of Saxony comprised the lands of the Saxons in the north-western part of present-day Germany, namely, the contemporary German state of Lower Saxony as well as Westphalia and Western Saxony-Anhalt, not corresponding to the modern German state of Saxony.

Frankish king Charlemagne conquered Saxony and integrated it into the Carolingian Empire. In the later 9th century, power began to shift from the (Eastern) Frankish king to the local Saxon rulers, resulting in the emergence of the Younger stem duchy.

Independent Saxony
Hadugato (fl. c. 531)
Berthoald (fl. c. 622)
Theoderic (fl. c. 743–744)
Widukind (c. 777–785), leader against Charlemagne
Albion (fl. c. 785–811)

Saxony as part of Frankish kingdom(s)

With the removal of the Welfs in 1180, the Duchy of Saxony was sharply reduced in territory. Westphalia fell to the Archbishop of Cologne, while the Duchy of Brunswick remained with the Welfs. The Ascanian Dukes had their base further east, near the Elbe, in what is sometimes called the younger Duchy of Saxony, resulting in the name Saxony moving towards the east. After the division, the counting of the dukes started anew. Though the first Ascanian duke is competingly counted as Bernard III (because of two predecessors of the same name before 1180) or as Bernard I, his successor, Albert I is already usually counted as the first, although before 1180 he had one predecessor of the same name, Albert the Bear.

In the 10th century the Emperor Otto I had created the County Palatine of Saxony in the Saale-Unstrut area of southern Saxony. The honour was initially held by a Count of Hessengau, then from the early 11th century by the Counts of Goseck, later by the Counts of Sommerschenburg, and still later by the Landgraves of Thuringia. When the Wettin landgraves succeeded to the Electorate of Saxony, the two positions merged.

The Younger Saxony: The Duchy and the Electorate

The new dukes replaced the Saxon horse emblem and introduced their Ascanian family colours and emblem added by a bendwise crancelin, symbolising the Saxon ducal crown, as new coat-of-arms of Saxony. The later rulers of the House of Wettin adopted the Ascanian coat-of-arms.

After the division, the counting of the dukes started anew. Though the first Ascanian duke is counted either as Bernard III (because of two predecessors of the same name before 1180) or as Bernard I, his successor, Albert I is counted as the first, although before 1180 he had one predecessor of the same name, Albert the Bear.

House of Ascania

Partitions of Saxony under Ascanian rule

Table of rulers
(Note: Both lines follow the numbering established in this table until 1296, when they were created. From 1296 on, each line follows independently the succession of Saxon dukes until 1296)

The male line of the Saxe-Lauenburgish Ascanians was extinguished in 1689, after Julius Francis' death. In spite of having left two daughters to inherit the rights to the duchy, the House of Welf usurped the duchy, preventing the succession of the legitimate heiress, Anna Maria Franziska of Saxe-Lauenburg, and resucceeded with its Brunswick and Lunenburg-Celle line. In fact, George William, Duke of Brunswick-Lüneburg was a great-great-grandson of Magnus I through his great-grandmother Dorothea of Saxe-Lauenburg. His descendants became Monarchs of Great Britain from 1714 on. In 1814, after being deposed by various occupations in the Napoleonic Wars, George III's son, Regent George agreed to pass Saxe-Lauenburg to his Danish cousin in a general territorial realignment at the Congress of Vienna. This cousin was Frederick VI of Denmark, who changed the official colours of Saxe-Lauenburg to red and gold. The duchy changed hands again when, in 1865, Christian IX of Denmark was deposed in Second Schleswig War and resigned by Treaty of Vienna; Saxe-Lauenburg passed to William I of Prussia, to whom the Estates of Saxe-Lauenburg offered the ducal throne. The coat-of-arms of Saxe-Lauenburg was changed to the colours red and silver, with a border in the Prussian colours of black and white. Both duke and estates decided to merge Saxe-Lauenburg into Prussia, as district Duchy of Lauenburg, with effect from 1 July 1876.

House of Wettin
The Ascanian line of Saxe-Wittenberg became extinct with the death of Elector Albert III in 1422, whereafter Emperor Sigismund bestowed the country and electoral dignity upon Margrave Frederick IV of Meissen, who had been a loyal supporter in the Hussite Wars. Late Albert's Ascanian relative Duke Eric V of Saxe-Lauenburg protested in vain. Frederick, now one of the seven Prince-electors, was a member of the House of Wettin, which since 1089 had ruled over the adjacent Margraviate of Meissen up the Elbe river, established under Emperor Otto I in 965, and since 1242 also over the Landgraviate of Thuringia. Thus, in 1423, Saxe-Wittenberg, the Margraviate of Meissen and Thuringia were united under one ruler, and the unified territory.
gradually received the name of (Upper) Saxony (or simply Saxony).

Partitions of Saxony under Wettin rule

Table of rulers

Kingdom of Saxony
The Holy Roman Empire came to an end in 1806. The Elector of Saxony, allied to Napoleon I, anticipated its dissolution by becoming the ruler of an independent Kingdom of Saxony in 1806.

Heads of the House of Wettin since 1918 
The lineage of the House of Wettin continues, although the family no longer exercises any official role. For heads of government of Saxony since 1918, see List of Ministers-President of Saxony. For heads of state, see List of presidents of Germany.
 
King Frederick Augustus III, 1918–1932.
Margrave Friedrich Christian, 1932–1968.
Margrave Maria Emanuel, 1968–2012.
Margrave Albert, July - October 2012 (disputed).
Margrave Alexander, since 2012 (disputed). 
Margrave Rüdiger, 2012-2022 (disputed).
Prince Michael of Saxe-Weimar, since 2012 (disputed (since the death of his own father in 1988, Prince Michael has been the most senior agnate of the House of Wettin).
Margrave Daniel, since 2022 (disputed).

See also
Coat of arms of Saxony
History of Saxony

References

External links
 House Laws of the Kingdom of Saxony

Saxon monarchs
Saxony
Saxon rulers
Saxon dukes